Hemmoor is a Samtgemeinde ("collective municipality") in the district of Cuxhaven, in Lower Saxony, Germany. Its seat is in Hemmoor.

The Samtgemeinde Hemmoor consists of the following municipalities:

 Hechthausen 
 Hemmoor
 Osten

References

Cuxhaven (district)
Samtgemeinden in Lower Saxony